Rudolf von Ribbentrop (11 May 1921 - 20 May 2019) was a German decorated Waffen-SS officer who served in World War II and wine merchant. His father was German diplomat and Foreign Minister Joachim von Ribbentrop. His autobiography gave further insight to his father and the last days of Adolf Hitler

Early life
Rudolf Von Ribbentrop was born in Wiesbaden as one of 5 children to Joachim Von Ribbentrop. His father was appointed in 1936 as German Ambassador to the United Kingdom in 1936 and was accompanied to London by Rudolf. Enrolled into Westminster School, he has to later return to a boarding school in Germany after The Times became aware of his presence.

World War II
On 1 September 1939, when the Second World War started, Ribbentrop joined as a private soldier in the SS-Infantry Regiment Deutschland, with which he served during the Western Campaign, receiving the Iron Cross second class. During Operation Barbarossa, the invasion of the Soviet Union, his unit was sent to Finland. In February 1943 he was  assigned to a Panzer regiment the Leibstandarte SS Adolf Hitler division (LSSAH) and sent to Kharkov in February 1943, where he took part in the Third Battle of Kharkov. 

Ribbentrop was awarded the Knight's Cross of the Iron Cross on 15 July 1943. On 1 August he was transferred to the newly formed SS Division Hitlerjugend as a training officer and company commander. During battles in Normandy, Ribbentrop was awarded the German Cross in Gold. Following the breakout from Falaise, he saw action during Battle of the Bulge. He surrendered with the division to the U.S. Army on 8 May 1945.

Author
Post-war Ribbentrop became a wine merchant and wrote this memoirs. These gave fresh insight into the career of his father and also an insight in the final days of Adolf Hitler. His work included previously unpublished photographs of his family and Hitler.

Works
My Father Joachim von Ribbentrop: Hitler's Foreign Minister, Experiences and Memories Publisher: Pen & Sword Books Ltd  ISBN: 9781526739254

References

External links
 https://www.waterstones.com/book/my-father-joachim-von-ribbentrop/rudolf-von-ribbentrop/9781526739254
 https://www.warhistoryonline.com/instant-articles/wounded-five-times-and-awarded.html/amp

1921 births
2019 deaths
German untitled nobility
Ribbentrop family
SS-Hauptsturmführer
Recipients of the Gold German Cross
Recipients of the Knight's Cross of the Iron Cross
Recipients of the Order of the Cross of Liberty
People educated at Westminster School, London
Waffen-SS personnel
German autobiographers
Panzer commanders
Military personnel from Wiesbaden